The 1940–41 Greek Football Cup was never completed, due to the invasion of Greece by Italy. Only the First Round was carried out.

First round

|-
|colspan="5" style="background-color:#D0D0D0" align=center|Athens Football Clubs Association
||colspan="2" 

||colspan="2" rowspan="3" 

|-
|colspan="5" style="background-color:#D0D0D0" align=center|Piraeus Football Clubs Association
||colspan="2" rowspan="3" 

|-
|colspan="5" style="background-color:#D0D0D0" align=center|Thessaly Football Clubs Association
||colspan="2" rowspan="5" 

|-
|colspan="5" style="background-color:#D0D0D0" align=center|Macedonia Football Clubs Association
||colspan="2" rowspan="3" 

|-
|colspan="5" style="background-color:#D0D0D0" align=center|Eastern Macedonia/Thrace Football Clubs Association
||colspan="2" rowspan="4" 

|-
|colspan="5" style="background-color:#D0D0D0" align=center|Patras Football Clubs Association
||colspan="2" rowspan="5" 

|}

References

External links
Greek Cup 1940-41 at RSSSF
np. "Athnlitismos", October 1940.

Greek Football Cup seasons
Greek Cup
1940–41 in Greek football